The Anaheim Packing House is a  gourmet food hall in Downtown Anaheim, California, United States. Along with the Packard Building, a renovated 1925 Mission Revival style building, and a farmer's market, it makes up a shopping center called the Anaheim Packing District. The Packing House opened on May 31, 2014, and is located in a renovated 1919 former Sunkist citrus packing house built in Spanish Colonial Revival style. It is one of the few remaining packing houses in Orange County, and the only one in Anaheim. The packing house was added to the National Register of Historic Places as the Anaheim Orange and Lemon Association Packing House in 2015.

References

External links

Anaheim Packing District

Food halls
Packing houses
Buildings and structures in Anaheim, California
Tourist attractions in Anaheim, California
Food markets in the United States
Spanish Colonial Revival architecture in California
Industrial buildings completed in 1919
History of Anaheim, California
National Register of Historic Places in Orange County, California
1919 establishments in California
2014 establishments in California
Agricultural buildings and structures on the National Register of Historic Places in California
Commercial buildings on the National Register of Historic Places in California
Industrial buildings and structures on the National Register of Historic Places in California
Shopping malls in Orange County, California
Shopping malls established in 2014
Orange production